Events from the year 1747 in Ireland.

Incumbent
Monarch: George II

Events
19 January – "Kelly riots" at the Smock Alley Theatre in Dublin when Thomas Sheridan, the proprietor, is in dispute with some gentlemen.
28 February – George Stone, Church of Ireland Bishop of Derry, is elevated to Archbishop of Armagh and Primate of All Ireland (letters patent 13 March), an office he will hold until 1764.
21 April – Edmund Burke sets up Burke's Club, a debating society at Trinity College Dublin, which will become the College Historical Society.
9–14 August – John Wesley pays his first visit to Ireland.
14 August – death of Thaddeus McCarthy, last Roman Catholic Bishop of Cork and Cloyne. The see is separated into the bishopric of Cork and the bishopric of Cloyne and Ross. 
9 September–20 March 1748 – Charles Wesley pays his first visit to Ireland.
11 September – Daniel O'Reilly is appointed to succeed Ross MacMahon as Roman Catholic Bishop of Clogher, an office he will hold until 1778.

Births
February – Daniel Delany, Bishop of Kildare and Leighton (1787–1814), founder of Carlow College (1793), Brigidine Sisters (1807) and Patrician Brothers (1808).
8 April – William Hales, clergyman and scientific writer (died 1831).
27 December – R. Luke Concanen, Dominican priest, consecrated first bishop of the Roman Catholic Diocese of New York (died 1810 in Naples).
John Dunlap, printer of the United States Declaration of Independence (died 1812 in the United States).
Andrew Robinson Stoney, adventurer (died 1810 in King's Bench Prison, London).

Deaths
27 May – Bernard MacMahon, Roman Catholic Archbishop of Armagh (born 1680).
Anthony Duane, businessman in America (born 1679).

References

 
Years of the 18th century in Ireland
Ireland
1740s in Ireland